Martin T. Dooling (December 18, 1886, Alton, Illinois – August 21, 1966, Saint Louis, Missouri) was an American amateur soccer player who competed in the 1904 Summer Olympics. In 1904 he was a member of the St. Rose Parish team, which won the bronze medal in the soccer tournament. He played all four matches as a midfielder.

References

External links
Martin Dooling's profile at databaseOlympics
Martin Dooling's profile at Sports Reference.com

1886 births
1966 deaths
American soccer players
Footballers at the 1904 Summer Olympics
Olympic bronze medalists for the United States in soccer
Soccer players from Illinois
People from Alton, Illinois
Medalists at the 1904 Summer Olympics
Association football midfielders